Hybolasius gracilipes is a species of beetle in the family Cerambycidae. It was described by Broun in 1903. It is known from New Zealand.

References

Hybolasius
Beetles described in 1903